Cyperus tabularis is a species of sedge that is native to parts of South Africa.

See also 
 List of Cyperus species

References 

tabularis
Plants described in 1832
Flora of South Africa
Taxa named by Heinrich Schrader